This is a list of notable companies based in the Austin metropolitan area.

Fortune 500
(rankings as of 2021)
Dell Technologies (28)
Oracle (80)
Tesla Inc. (100)

Advertising
 Door Number 3
 GSD&M
 LatinWorks
 LIN Media (Media General)-Shutdown 
 McGarrah Jessee
 R/GA
 RetailMeNot
 Rock Candy Media
 T3 (The Think Tank)

Aerospace and air travel
 Astrotech Corporation
 Austin Express- Shutdown
 Emerald Air-Closed

Architecture
 Dick Clark Architecture
 Lundgren and Maurer-Closed in the 80s no successor
 Reclaimed Space

Automotive
 Tesla

Beauty
Beardbrand
 Birds Barbershop

Biotechnology
 Asuragen-Relocation to Minneapolis, Minnesota
 Luminex Corporation
 Sonic Healthcare- Bought and moved to Australia

Booksellers and publishing

 BookPeople
 Clockwork Storybook-Shutdown 
 Greenleaf Book Group
 Holt McDougal
 Landes Bioscience
 Monofonus Press
 Steve Jackson Games

Construction

Data
 Forcepoint
 Global Language Monitor
 Hoover's
 MyEdu
 NetSolve (Cisco Systems)
 Vignette Corporation (Open Text Corporation)- Headquartered in Canada

Direct marketing
 QuantumDigital

Education
MakerSquare
University of Texas at Austin

Energy
 Crystatech
 Green Mountain Energy
 HelioVolt-Suspended operations in 2015
 Illumitex

Environmental monitoring

 VI Technology-Acquired by Aeroflex

Esports

 Tribe Gaming

Film and television

 Alamo Drafthouse Cinema
 Bright Shining City Productions
 FloSports
 Rooster Teeth Productions
 Troublemaker Studios
 Uptown Studios Austin

Finance and banking
 Kasasa
 Dimensional Fund Advisors
 Farm Credit Bank of Texas

Food and drink

 Amy's Ice Creams
 Bush's Chicken-Relocation to Waco, Texas
 Carino's Italian
 Chameleon Cold-Brew
 Chuy's
 DoubleDave's Pizzaworks
 Gatti's Pizza- Relocation to Fort Worth before shutdown
 KaleidoScoops
 Live Oak Brewing Company
 Oasis Restaurant
 Siete Foods
 Sweet Leaf Tea Company
 Texadelphia-Relocation to Dallas
 Tiff's Treats
 Tito's Vodka
 Whole Foods Market
 YETI Coolers

Gaming development, distribution and production

 Arkane Studios
 Aspyr
 Battlecry Studios
 Bluepoint Games
 Certain Affinity
 Crytek USA- Shutdown in 2013
 Devolver Digital
 Edge of Reality- Dissolved 2018
 Gamecock Media Group- Shutdown in 2008
 GameSalad
 Ghostfire Games- Closed in 2019
 Heatwave Interactive
 KingsIsle Entertainment
 Portalarium- Closed 2019 
 Powerhouse Animation Studios, Inc.
 Renegade Kid- Dissolved 2016
 Retro Studios
 Rooster Teeth Games
 Roxor Games
 Spacetime Studios
 Twisted Pixel Games
 Wolfpack Studios- Shutdown in 2006

Insurance
 National Western Life

Intelligence
 Stratfor

Internet service providers
 Wayport, Inc., acquired by AT&T in 2008

Loans
 EZCorp

Manufacturing

 Cerilliant Corporation
 CompuAdd- Closed in the 90s
 Elgin-Butler Brick Company
 IKey
 Motion Computing
 National Instruments
 Ronco-Fully dissolved in bankruptcy 2018
 SuperCircuits
 Tesla
 Valence Technology

Music
 Blastro
 Blastro Networks
 Collings Guitars
 Emperor Jones
 Waterloo Records
 Western Vinyl

Non-governmental organizations (NGOs)
 Bat Conservation International
 Knowbility

Real estate
 American Campus Communities
 Econohomes
 Forestar Group-No longer located in Austin, headquartered in Arlington, Texas
 HomeAway- Acquired and relocated in 2015 by Expedia
 Keller Williams Realty
 Opcity-Shutdown by Move, Inc.

Retail

 Allens Boots
 Bravelets
 Despair, Inc.
 Eyebuydirect
 Kendra Scott
 L.G. Balfour Company
 Living Direct
 Outdoor Voices
 Whole Foods Market, a division of Amazon

Security
 Knight security systems

Semiconductors
 Advanced Technology Development Facility
 Cirrus Logic
 NXP Semiconductors
 Silicon Laboratories

Shipping
 uShip

Software

 Academic Superstore
 Asure Software
 Bazaarvoice
 BigCommerce
 Borland-Full acquisition by Micro Focus International
 Convio
 Enthought
 Evolutionary Technologies International- Bought out by Inspire
 Honestech
 Indeed.com
 InduSoft-Merged with Schneider Electric
 Meta SaaS
 Metreos-Acquired by Cisco Systems
 Oracle Corporation
 Pervasive Software-Acquired by Actian
 Photodex-Permanently shut down 
 Planview
 Pristine
 SolarWinds
 Spiceworks
 Spredfast
 Third Wire
 Ticketbud
 Trilogy
 Vrbo
 Winternals
 Xojo
 Zello

Telecommunications
 LifeSize
 Protect America-Assets sold to Brinks
 TippingPoint-Acquired and relocated by Trend Micro

Utilities

 Lower Colorado River Authority

See also 
Silicon Hills

References

 
Austin
Companies based in